Bala Keru Kola (also Romanized as Bālā Kerū Kolā and Bālā Karū Kolā; also known as  Kerū Kolā) is a village in Karipey Rural District, Lalehabad District, Babol County, Mazandaran Province, Iran. At the 2006 census, its population was 470, in 121 families.

References 

Populated places in Babol County